Caloptilia callichora is a moth of the family Gracillariidae. It is found in Guyana.

References

callichora
Gracillariidae of South America
Moths described in 1915